Detkino is a rural locality (a village) in Chernushinsky District, Perm Krai, Russia. The population was 42 as of 2010. There are 2 streets.

Geography 
Detkino is located 21 km northeast of Chernushka (the district's administrative centre) by road. Verkhny Kozmyash is the nearest rural locality.

References 

Rural localities in Chernushinsky District